Stefano Russo may refer to:

 Stefano Russo (footballer, born 1989), Italian footballer
 Stefano Russo (footballer, born 2000), German-Italian footballer

See also
 Russo
 Stefano Rosso (1948–2008), Italian singer-songwriter and guitarist
 Stefano Rosso (businessman) (born 1979), Italian businessman